William M. Beavers (born February 21, 1935) is a former Democratic politician from Illinois, US. He is a former Chicago alderman and former County Commissioner for the 4th district of Cook County, Illinois, which encompasses part of Chicago's South Side and southern suburbs.  He has been convicted of federal tax evasion.

Early life 
Beavers was born and raised in Chicago's Kenwood-Oakland neighborhood, one of six children in an African-American family. Beavers' mother worked in retail and as a waitress. Beavers' father was a steel mill worker. Later, Beavers' father worked for a wrecking company and died in an accident on the job. Beavers was educated in the Chicagos and attended Harold Washington College. Beavers was a Chicago police officer for 21 years.

Chicago Alderman 
Beavers was an alderman of the 7th Ward in Chicago's far south side. A member of the Democratic Party, he served in the Chicago City Council from 1983 to 2006.

Beavers said he had read Linda Lovelace's autobiography Ordeal, and had visited a topless beach and a nude beach, but had never visited a nudist camp, speaking on April 11, 2000 during testimony at a public hearing before the Finance Committee of the Chicago City Council on a proposed designation of a part of Walton Street in Chicago's Streeterville neighborhood, the location of the first Playboy Club, as "Hugh Hefner Way" in honor of Playboy founder Hugh Hefner.

Cook County Commissioner 
In 2006, Beavers reportedly engineered a complex deal concerning the retirement of Cook County Board President John Stroger, who suffered a stroke in March of that year. The deal called for Beavers to assume Stroger's County Commissioner seat, Stroger's son, Todd Stroger, to replace his father on the November 2006 ballot as County Board president, and for Chicago Mayor Richard M. Daley to appoint Beavers' daughter and chief of staff, Darcel Beavers, to her father's 7th Ward seat.

Tax evasion conviction 
On February 23, 2012, Beavers was indicted on four federal charges alleging he filed false tax returns and "endeavoring to obstruct and impede" the Internal Revenue Service.  Following the indictment, he lashed out against the federal prosecutor.    On March 21, 2013, Beavers was found guilty of tax evasion and faced a maximum three-year prison term on each of the four tax counts he was found guilty of. Beavers was sentenced to six months in jail, a $10,000 fine, and ordered to pay almost $31,000 in back taxes. In June, 2014, the 7th Circuit Court of Appeals upheld his conviction.

Personal life 
Beavers has a son and two daughters. One daughter, Darcel, was his aldermanic chief of staff and was appointed to succeed Beavers as alderman.

"I like to go to the gambling boats, maybe twice a week. Play the slots. That's my relaxation," Beavers said in profile in the Chicago Tribune Sunday Magazine in 2006.

References

External links
 
 William Beavers archive at the Chicago Reader

1935 births
Chicago City Council members
Chicago Police Department officers
Illinois Democrats
Living people
Members of the Cook County Board of Commissioners
Illinois politicians convicted of crimes
American people convicted of tax crimes
African-American city council members in Illinois
21st-century African-American people